The Linbury Prize for Stage Design is the most prestigious prize for emerging stage designers with professional focus on theatre, dance, and opera companies in the United Kingdom. Since 1987, it has been awarded every two years.

History 
In 1973, Lord Sainsbury of Preston Candover KG (John Sainsbury) and his wife Lady Sainsbury, CBE, the former ballerina Anya Linden, founded the charitable Linbury Trust (Linbury is a portmanteau combining the names Linden and Sainsbury). The Linbury Prize, intending to launch the careers of young stage designers, is funded entirely by the Linbury Trust and supported by a group of advocates, endorsing its aims. The first Linbury Prizes were awarded in 1987.

Selection 
The selection to determine the winners follows a procedure:
 The designs of entrants, recent graduates of theatre design courses at colleges across the United Kingdom, are presented to a group of three jurors. 
 The designs of more than twelve candidates are selected.
 The selected candidates present their designs to the directors and choreographers of three previously selected, commissioning British theatre, opera house, or dance companies. 
 Each company selects three designers with whom they desire to collaborate. 
 The twelve finalists are asked to create designs for the companies forthcoming productions. Their expenses are covered by a sum supplied by the Linbury Trust.
 Four designs, one for each production, are selected. Their creators are the winners of the Linbury Prize for Stage Design, which is the commission to realise the selected designs on stage. Financial support for the winner as well as for the commissioning company is supplied by the Linbury Trust.

Winners 

From 1987 until 1995, three prizes, including the overall winner (OW), were awarded biennially.
Since 1997, four prizes are awarded biennially.
The following designers are awarded winners:

Website 
 Official website

References 

Awards established in 1987
Fellowships
Design awards